The Borlaug CAST Communication Award, formerly the Charles A. Black Award, is an annual award presented by the Council for Agricultural Science and Technology (CAST) focused on candidates who engage in promoting agriculture and agriculture-related communications.

Recipients
 1986: Charles A. Black
 1987: William E. Larson
 1989: Stanley E. Curtis
 1990: Donald E. Davis
 1991: Homer M. LeBaron
 1992: John Pesek
 1993: Fergus M. Clydesdale
 1994: F. J. Francis
 1995: Dale E. Bauman
 1996: Luther G. Tweeten
 1997: Neil E. Harl
 1998: Per Pinstrup-Andersen
 1999: Abner W. Womack
 2000: Dennis R. Keeney
 2001: Judith S. Stern
 2002: Calvin O. Qualset
 2003: Kong Luen Heong
 2004: Marjorie A. Hoy
 2005: Norman Borlaug
 2006: Stanley R. Johnson
 2007: David H. Baker
 2008: Pedro A. Sanchez
 2009: Richard Wayne Skaggs
 2010: Akin Adesina
 2011: Catherine Bertini
 2012: Carl Winter
 2013: Jeff Simmons, President of Elanco
 2014: Alison Van Eenennaam
 2015: Channapatna S. Prakash 
 2016: Kevin Folta

Notes

External links
 Official award page

See also
 Public awareness of science
 Science journalism

Awards established in 1986
American journalism awards
Science communication awards
Science and technology awards
1986 establishments in the United States